"Spikee" is a non-album single by British electronic music group Underworld, originally released on 6 December 1993 in the UK. It entered the UK Singles Chart at number 63 on 18 December 1993 for one week.

Track listings 

 12-inch: JBO / JBO 17 (UK) 
 "Spikee" – 12:34 (Hyde/Smith/Emerson)
 "Dogman Go Woof" – 12:13 (Smith/Emerson)

 CD: JBO / JBO 17 CD (UK) 
 "Spikee" – 12:34
 "Dogman Go Woof" – 12:13

Notes 
Dogman Go Woof written, produced and mixed by Rick Smith and Darren Emerson
Published by Underworld / Sherlock Holmes Music
Sleeve design by Third Planet Inc.
The text 'PICK YOUR OWN' is etched into the run-out groove of the 12".
The text 'DOGMANGOWOOF' is etched into the run-out groove of the 500-only pressing Underworld 12" single, "Mother Earth / The Hump".

Appearances 
Spikee was released on CD as part of the 1992–2002 Anthology set released worldwide in 2003.
Spikee appears on Cyberspace 2 (a CD compilation) (1994) in an edited form.
Spikee appears on Foundations - Coming Up From the Streets (2CD Compilation) (1997)
Spikee appears on Wax Trax! MasterMix, a 1999 Compilation CD.
Spikee appears on Dream Injection, Volume 1, a 1995 Compilation CD.
The Spikee video, directed by Graham Wood (1993), appears on the UK released video compilation Kiteless: A Tomato Project.
The same video version of Spikee also appears on the US released compilation, Footwear Repairs by Craftsmen at Competitive Prices.
"Spikee" also appeared on BBC's Saturday Afternoon Grandstand as background music.
The guitar section from "Spikee" also appeared as the title music for ITV's Saturday lunchtime football magazine On the Ball in the late 1990s and the early 2000s.

References

External links
 Underworldlive.com

Underworld (band) songs
1993 singles
1993 songs
Songs written by Darren Emerson
Songs written by Karl Hyde
Songs written by Rick Smith (musician)